AFX may stand for:

 AFX Windows Rootkit 2003, a user-mode Windows rootkit that hides files, processes and registry
 AFX News Limited, a London financial news agency
 Animation Framework eXtension, a model for representing 3D graphics content defined in MPEG-4 Part 16
 Aphex Twin (born 1971), electronic musician
 Application Framework eXtensions, an old name for the Microsoft Foundation Class Library (MFC)
 Aurora AFX, a brand of slot car marketed by Aurora Plastics Corporation
 A replacement for the A-6 Intruder, developed by the United States Navy and United States Air Force (canceled in 1991)